Dovecot may refer to:
 Dovecot (software), an email package
 Dovecot, Liverpool, north-west England
 Dovecote (or dovecot), a building for pigeons or doves

See also
 Dovecote (disambiguation)